Hendrik Karel Offerhaus (20 May 1875 – 2 September 1953) was a Dutch medical doctor and rower who competed in the 1900 Summer Olympics. He was part of the Dutch boat Minerva Amsterdam, which finished third in the eight event.

After completing his medical studies, he worked as a surgeon in The Hague, Groningen and Deventer among others. In Deventer he became involved with the Dutch Red Cross. During the Balkan War in 1913, he worked with the Dutch Red Cross in Greece. In 1931,  he gave up his surgical practice in order to devote himself fully to the Red Cross. He later became secretary-general of the Dutch Red Cross.

References

External links

1875 births
1953 deaths
Dutch male rowers
Olympic bronze medalists for the Netherlands
Olympic medalists in rowing
Olympic rowers of the Netherlands
Rowers at the 1900 Summer Olympics
People from Venhuizen
Medalists at the 1900 Summer Olympics
Sportspeople from North Holland